Malone is a surname.

Malone may also refer to:

Places

Northern Ireland 
Malone Road in Balmoral, Belfast
Malone, Belfast
Upper Malone
 Malone Park

United States
 Malone, Florida
 Malone, Iowa
 Malone, Kentucky
 Malone (town), New York
 Malone (village), New York
 Malone Armory, National Guard armory in New York
 Malone Freight Depot, railroad freight depot located at Malone
 Malone, Oregon
 Malone, Texas
 Malone, Washington
 Malone, Wisconsin
 Malone Auxiliary Field, military airfield north-northeast of Marianna, Florida
 Malone Creek

 Malone Formation, a geologic formation in Texas

Other places
Malone River in Piedmont, Italy

Colleges 
Malone University, a private college in Canton, Ohio 
Malone College (Northern Ireland), an integrated school in Belfast

Other uses 
 Malone (film), a 1987 film starring Burt Reynolds
Malone Golf Club, golf club near Belfast
 Malone RFC, a rugby club in Belfast
 "Malone" (2000AD), a 2000 AD story
Malone Society, publication andscholarly society devoted to the study of 16th- and early 17th-century drama

See also
Bugsy Malone, a 1976 musical film
"Molly Malone", a Dublin song